Sir Arthur Edward Trevor Benson GCMG (21 December 1907 – 1987) was a British colonial administrator and governor.

Early life
Benson was born in Johannesburg on 21 December 1907 the son of an Anglican clergyman. Educated at Wolverhampton Grammar School and Exeter College, Oxford he joined the colonial service in 1931.

Colonial service
Benson was sent to Northern Rhodesia as a cadet later moving on to the Secretariat in Lusaka. During the Second World War he returned to London and was attached to the Cabinet Office. After the war he returned to Northern Rhodesia and the Luwingu outstation. In 1948 he became Chief Secretary of the Central African Council and in 1951 he was promoted to Chief Secretary of Nigeria. In 1954 he was appointed Governor of Northern Rhodesia until he retired in 1959.

Retirement
He became a Justice of the Peace in Devon from 1962 to 1966 and he was also elected an Honorary Fellow of Exeter College.

Family life
Benson had married Daphne and they had two daughters, he died in 1987.

References

1907 births
1987 deaths
Governors of Northern Rhodesia
White South African people
Knights Grand Cross of the Order of St Michael and St George
Alumni of Exeter College, Oxford
People educated at Wolverhampton Grammar School
Fellows of Exeter College, Oxford
People from Johannesburg
People from Devon
South African people of British descent
South African emigrants to the United Kingdom
British expatriates in Zambia